"Mambo Mambo" is Lou Bega's fourth single from his album A Little Bit of Mambo. It became a hit only on the French singles chart where it peaked at #11 and was certified Silver, and in the Walloon singles chart where it peaked at #25.

Track listing
CD single
 "Mambo Mambo" (Radio Version) – 3:17
 "Baby Keep Smiling" (Album Version) – 3:10

References

2000 singles
Lou Bega songs
1999 songs
Songs written by Lou Bega